A ballroom is a large room inside a building, the primary purpose of which is holding large formal parties called balls.

Ballroom, ball room, etc. may also refer to:
Ballroom, a house music subgenre, associated with ballroom culture
Ballroom dance, dance style commonly called simply "ballroom"
Ballroom (musical), a 1978 Broadway musical
The Ballroom, 2007 Brazilian-French romantic drama 
"Ballroom", a 2018 song by Jack River from Sugar Mountain